This page is a list of group shows of the Stuckism International art movement.
Australia
2000 - The Real Turner Prize Show
2002 - Stuck Down South
Belgium
2006 - United Colours ltd. in Brussels
Czech
2007 - Stuck in the Middle of November
2008 - Between dream and reality
2008 - Stuck in the Middle of November II
2010 - Private landscapes
2010 - Stuck at the National gallery
2011 - Prague Stuckists
2012 - Stuck in the Castle

France
2001 - First Stuckist Show in Paris
2005 - Les Stuckistes A Paris
Germany
2000 - Stuckism in Germany
2000 - Stuck in Freiburg
2000 - Stuck in Köln
2004 - Stuckists in the Walker—Stuckists in Lewenhagen
2006 - Stuckomenta I in Hamburg
2006 - Stuckomenta II in Lewenhagen
2007 - Stuckomenta III in Munich
2007 - Flotter stuckistischer Dreier in Hamburg
Greece
2010 - Under the Cover of Romantic Anonymity: The 1st Stuckist Event in Greece
Iran
2010 - Tehran Stuckists: Searching for the Unlimited Potentials of Figurative Painting
2013 - International Stuckists: Painters Out of Order
Spain
2009 - Catalonia Stuckists
2009 - Catalonia Stuckists: Stuckist Fest Anniversary 2009
2009 - The Negation of the Anti-art: All the Paintings We Have ever Done
2012 - Remodernist Artists Against Rubbish
UK

1999 - Stuck! Stuck! Stuck!
2000 - The First Art Show Of the New Millennium
2000 - The Resignation of Sir Nicholas Serota
2000 - Students for Stuckism: A Remodernist Painting Show and Talk
2000 - Stuck!
2000 - The Real Turner Prize Show
2001 - The Stuckists: The First Remodernist Art Group
2001 - The Oxford Stuckists First Exhibition
2001 - Vote Stuckist
2001 - Stuck in Worthing
2002 - Stuck Up North!
2002 - I Don't Want a Painting Degree if it Means Not Painting
2002 - The First Stuckist International
2003 - A Dead Shark Isn't Art

2003 - The Stuckists Summer Show
2003 - Stuck in Worthing, Again
2003 - Stuck in Wednesbury
2003 - War on Blair
2004 - Members Only: the Artist Group in Contemporary Japan and Britain
2004 - Stuckist Classics
2004 - The Stuckists Punk Victorian
2004 - "Stigmata" or "Censorious": The Stuckists Punk Victorian
2004 - Stuck in the Country
2004 - Stuckist Punk Victorian Lite If You Can't Be Bothered to Go to Liverpool
2004 - More of the Welsh Bit of the Stuckists Punk Victorian

2005 - "Painting Is the Medium of Yesterday"—Paul Myners CBE, Chairman of Tate Gallery, Chairman of Marks and Spencer, Chairman of Aspen Insurance, Chairman of Guardian Media, Director of Bank of England, Director of Bank of New York. A Show of Paintings by the Stuckists, as Refused by the Tate Gallery. Guaranteed 100% Free of Elephant Dung.
2006 - Go West 
2006 - The Triumph of Stuckism
2007 - Mark D and the Stuckists vs Tracey Emin and Damien Hirst
2007 - I Won't Have Sex with You as Long as We're Married
2008 - An Antidote to the Ghastly Turner Prize
2010 - The Enemies of Art
2010 - Stuckist Clowns Doing Their Dirty Work
2011 - Stuck on the Wall: The Young and the Old
2011 - The Enemies of Art

2014 -  Crazy Over You
US
2001 - Touring Show
2002 - Stuckist Paintings at the Fringe
2002 - We Just Wanna Show Some Fuckin' Paintings
2003 - War on Bush
2004 - The Stuckists Punk Victorian in the Toilet
2005 - Addressing the Shadow and Making Friends with Wild Dogs: Remodernism
2009 - New Life: The Premiere Exhibition of the Miami Stuckists
2010 - Stuck in Fort Lauderdale: The Raving Reactionary Miami Stuckist Daubers

References
General
"Stuckist shows", stuckism.com. The source for information, unless specified otherwise. Retrieved 7 September 2011.
Specific

Stuckism